Love and Suicide is a 2005 feature film romance by Luis Moro and Lisa France, starring Moro, Kamar de los Reyes and Daisy McCrackin. Moro wrote and filmed it over the course of 12 days in 2003, while attending the Havana International Film Festival for his previous film, Anne B. Real. This was the first film to be shot by an American in Cuba since 1959, when actor Errol Flynn made his last picture, Cuban Rebel Girls.

Plot summary 
Tomas (Kamar De Los Reyes) lives in a vicious circle of life and death. To bury his grief over a lost love, he enters a world between dreams and reality; the path between love and suicide. Alberto (Luis Moro) peacefully swims with life, knowing life will never outlast eternal time; dreams and reality are the same. Tomas find himself in a world of history preserved in the present, where time has stopped, and souls rise beyond material surfaces. This world exists in Cuba. Nina (Daisy McCrackin) a modern-day gypsy looking for her purpose in life, while Tomas keeps running from his. In a frantic moment, Tomas recalls the simplicity brought forth with Nina and the ultimate test of authenticity given by Alberto. In this moment, Tomas discovers the one thing between love and suicide.

Behind the scenes 
Love & Suicide began as a screenplay that was inspired by Moro's desire to make a film in his native country of Cuba. The cast and crew paid their own way to Havana to shoot the film. Originally Moro and France's earlier film, Anne B. Real, was accepted into the Havana Film Festival. The intention was to shoot their film, while they were at the festival. Described by France as a “no budget” project, the film was shot by Lichtenstein, who carried a shoebox-sized DVX HD digital camera, two wireless microphones and flashlights with a small saucer reflector for lighting. The 40 hours of unedited scenes shot in the streets, parks, and buildings of Old Havana were produced after cast and crew kept their commitments to the daily events of the film festival.

References

External links 
 Official site
 
 Chang, Daniel; "Ignoring embargo, Americans film in Cuba". Accessed July 16, 2005
 Public Magazine interviews filmmakers Luis Moro and Pete Maez on the making of the biggest little picture Love & Suicide. Shot in Havana, Cuba by Cuban-American Filmmakers.
 HAVANA-Cuban-American filmmaker Luis Moro expressed his disdain for the long-standing U.S. trade and travel restrictions against Cuba in a very public way: he made a movie there. AP
 CBS4 News Miami Luis Moro interview US/Eastern Cuban Filmmaker Violates Embargo, Makes Film” Dave Malkoff 
 Inside the making of Love & Suicide | Monty Joynes
 URBAN LATINO Sexy Kamar de los Reyes Invades Cuba for Love & Suicide. Urban Latino got it all. Jesus Trivino Alarcon
 Video Press Archive

2005 films
American drama films
2005 drama films
Films about suicide
2000s American films